Harry Burrows Acton (2 June 1908 – 16 June 1974) was an English academic in the field of political philosophy, known for books defending the morality of capitalism, and attacking Marxism-Leninism. He in particular produced arguments on the incoherence of Marxism, which he described as a 'farrago' (in philosophical terms). His book The Illusion of the Epoch, in which this appears, is a standard point of reference. Other interests were the Marquis de Condorcet, Hegel, John Stuart Mill, Herbert Spencer, F. H. Bradley, Bernard Bosanquet and Sidney Webb. Acton also endorsed a version of negative utilitarianism, according to which the reduction of suffering has unique moral importance.

He had teaching positions at the London School of Economics, Bedford College, the University of Edinburgh where he occupied the Chair of Moral Philosophy, and the University of Chicago. He was editor of Philosophy, the journal of the Royal Institute of Philosophy, of which he was for a time Director. He was president of the Aristotelian Society from 1952 to 1953.

He is buried in Grange Cemetery in Edinburgh close to the main entrance.

Works
The Illusion of the Epoch: Marxism-Leninism as a Philosophical Creed (1955)
The Philosophy of Language in Revolutionary France (1959) Dawes Hicks Lecture of the British Academy
What Marx Really Said (1967)
Philosophy of Punishment (1969) editor
Kant's moral philosophy (1970)
The Morals of Markets: an Ethical Exploration (1971) essays edited by David Gordon and Jeremy Shearmur. 2nd edition (1993), Liberty Fund, 
The Right to Work and the Right to Strike (1972)
The ethics of capitalism (The Company and its Responsibilities) (1972)
The idea of a spiritual power: 1973 Auguste Comte memorial trust lecture (1974)

References

External links
 H.B. Acton, The Illusion of the Epoch: Marxism-Leninism as a Philosophical Creed (Indianapolis: Liberty Fund, 2003). See original text in The Online Library of Liberty.

1908 births
1974 deaths
Writers from London
20th-century British philosophers
Academics of the University of Edinburgh
Academics of the London School of Economics
Academics of Royal Holloway, University of London
English philosophers
English political philosophers
People educated at St Olave's Grammar School
Presidents of the Aristotelian Society
English political writers
University of Chicago faculty
Burials at the Grange Cemetery
English social commentators